Limifossoridae is a family of molluscs belonging to the class Caudofoveata, order Chaetodermatida.

Genera:
 Limifossor Heath, 1904
 Metachaetoderma Thiele, 1913
 Psilodens Salvini-Plawen, 1977
 Scutopus Salvini-Plawen, 1968

References

Aplacophorans
Mollusc families